Limasene Teatu is a Tuvaluan diplomat. In 2017, she was appointed Ambassador to Taiwan. Her appointment made her Tuvalu's first woman ambassador. She was also Tuvalu's second formally appointed ambassador to Taiwan since bilateral relations were established in 1979. Shortly before she stepped down from the ambassadorship, Taiwan awarded Teatu the Order of Brilliant Star with Special Grand Cordon.

References

Year of birth missing (living people)
Living people
Ambassadors of Tuvalu to Taiwan
Women ambassadors
Place of birth missing (living people)
Recipients of the Order of Brilliant Star